This is a comprehensive discography of Dirty Pretty Things, an English band fronted by Carl Barât, a member of The Libertines. The band released 2 studio albums and 4 singles but split up in 2008.

Studio albums

Singles

DVDs

Music videos

References

Discographies of British artists
Rock music group discographies